Darren Holden (born 27 August 1993) is an English-South African professional footballer who plays for Clitheroe, as a defender.

Career
Born in Krugersdorp, South Africa, Holden made his senior debut for English club Hartlepool United in April 2011 in a 1–1 draw, with other debutants Andy Rafferty and Josh Rowbotham, against Tranmere Rovers.

After being a regular for the reserve and youth side, Holden was handed a professional deal with Hartlepool in April 2012.

Holden was rewarded with a new contract in December 2012 to keep him at Victoria Park. He went on to make 17 league appearances in the 2012–13 season which saw him challenging to keep the experienced left-back Evan Horwood out of the first-team.

Holden became a regular in the second half of the 2013–14 season after an injury to Neil Austin, which led to him starting in Pools' final twenty games of the season. In May 2014, Holden signed a new contract with Hartlepool.

He signed for Scottish club Ross County in June 2015, making his debut on 25 August in a 2–0 Scottish League Cup victory over Ayr United. He scored his first senior goal in a 7–0 Scottish League Cup win over Falkirk on 22 September.

On 5 February 2016, Holden signed for National League side Gateshead. He made his debut on 13 February as a substitute in a 0–4 defeat to Dover Athletic. He made a further 6 appearances before being released at the end of the season.

After a spell with Jarrow Roofing, he signed for South Shields in November 2016. He then played with West Auckland Town before moving to National League side Guiseley in 2017.

Following their relegation to the National League North, Holden was released from Guiseley and signed for Consett in 2018. After making 44 appearances in his first season with Consett, Holden signed a new contract to keep him with the club for a further year. He made a total of 133 appearances for Consett, scoring eleven times and also played for the club at Wembley Stadium in their 2020 FA Vase Final defeat. 

On 12 October 2022, he signed for Northern Premier League Division One West side Clitheroe, making his debut against Bootle in a 4-0 win.

Style of play
Holden is an attacking-minded left-back known for his long throws, fast pace, and having a strong left foot.

Honours
South Shields
FA Vase (1): 2016–17

Career statistics

References

1993 births
Living people
People from Krugersdorp
English footballers
South African soccer players
Association football defenders
Hartlepool United F.C. players
Ross County F.C. players
Gateshead F.C. players
Jarrow Roofing Boldon Community Association F.C. players
South Shields F.C. (1974) players
West Auckland Town F.C. players
Guiseley A.F.C. players
Consett A.F.C. players
Clitheroe F.C. players
English Football League players
National League (English football) players
White South African people
Northern Premier League players
Sportspeople from Gauteng